
Wołów County is a unit of territorial administration and local government (powiat) in Lower Silesian Voivodeship, south-western Poland. It came into being on January 1, 1999, as a result of the Polish local government reforms passed in 1998. Its administrative seat is the town of Wołów, although the county also contains the slightly larger town of Brzeg Dolny.

As of 2019 the total population of the county is 46,914, out of which the population of Wołów is 12,373, the population of Brzeg Dolny is 12,511, and the rural population is 22,030.

Neighbouring counties
Wołów County is bordered by Góra County to the north, Trzebnica County to the east, Środa Śląska County to the south, and Legnica County and Lubin County to the west.

Administrative division
The county is subdivided into three gminas (two urban-rural and one rural). These are listed in the following table, in descending order of population.

References

 
Land counties of Lower Silesian Voivodeship